Uchoa is a municipality in the state of São Paulo, Brazil. The population is of 10,151 inhabitants and the area is 252.5 km2. Uchoa belongs to the Mesoregion of São José do Rio Preto.

Economy
The Tertiary sector is the economic basis of Uchoa, corresponding to 62.27% of the city GDP. The Secondary sector is 21.83% of the GDP, and the Primary sector corresponds to 15.9%.

Notable people
Benjamin Abdala Júnior

References

Municipalities in São Paulo (state)